The Evenk constituency (No.224) was a Russian legislative constituency in the Evenk Autonomous Okrug in 1993–2007. In 2007 Evenk AO alongside neighbouring Taymyr AO were merged with Krasnoyarsk Krai, so currently the territory of former Evenk and Taymyr constituencies is now a part of Yeniseysk constituency of Krasnoyarsk Krai.

Members elected

Election results

1993

|-
! colspan=2 style="background-color:#E9E9E9;text-align:left;vertical-align:top;" |Candidate
! style="background-color:#E9E9E9;text-align:left;vertical-align:top;" |Party
! style="background-color:#E9E9E9;text-align:right;" |Votes
! style="background-color:#E9E9E9;text-align:right;" |%
|-
|style="background-color:"|
|align=left|Viktor Gayulsky
|align=left|Independent
|
|15.04%
|-
| colspan="5" style="background-color:#E9E9E9;"|
|- style="font-weight:bold"
| colspan="3" style="text-align:left;" | Total
| 
| 100%
|-
| colspan="5" style="background-color:#E9E9E9;"|
|- style="font-weight:bold"
| colspan="4" |Source:
|
|}

1995

|-
! colspan=2 style="background-color:#E9E9E9;text-align:left;vertical-align:top;" |Candidate
! style="background-color:#E9E9E9;text-align:left;vertical-align:top;" |Party
! style="background-color:#E9E9E9;text-align:right;" |Votes
! style="background-color:#E9E9E9;text-align:right;" |%
|-
|style="background-color:"|
|align=left|Viktor Gayulsky (incumbent)
|align=left|Independent
|
|24.07%
|-
|style="background-color:"|
|align=left|Vladimir Uvachan
|align=left|Independent
|
|17.17%
|-
|style="background-color:"|
|align=left|Sergey Uoday
|align=left|Independent
|
|9.81%
|-
|style="background-color:"|
|align=left|Igor Lavrikov
|align=left|Independent
|
|6.00%
|-
|style="background-color:"|
|align=left|Andrey Nikiforov
|align=left|Liberal Democratic Party
|
|5.24%
|-
|style="background-color:"|
|align=left|Alitet Nemtushkin
|align=left|Independent
|
|4.65%
|-
|style="background-color:"|
|align=left|Nikolay Anisimov
|align=left|Independent
|
|4.40%
|-
|style="background-color:"|
|align=left|Nikolay Grishanov
|align=left|Independent
|
|3.29%
|-
|style="background-color:"|
|align=left|Albert Shcherbachev
|align=left|Independent
|
|3.07%
|-
|style="background-color:"|
|align=left|Boris Stolyarov
|align=left|Independent
|
|2.84%
|-
|style="background-color:#000000"|
|colspan=2 |against all
|
|18.39%
|-
| colspan="5" style="background-color:#E9E9E9;"|
|- style="font-weight:bold"
| colspan="3" style="text-align:left;" | Total
| 
| 100%
|-
| colspan="5" style="background-color:#E9E9E9;"|
|- style="font-weight:bold"
| colspan="4" |Source:
|
|}

1999

|-
! colspan=2 style="background-color:#E9E9E9;text-align:left;vertical-align:top;" |Candidate
! style="background-color:#E9E9E9;text-align:left;vertical-align:top;" |Party
! style="background-color:#E9E9E9;text-align:right;" |Votes
! style="background-color:#E9E9E9;text-align:right;" |%
|-
|style="background-color:"|
|align=left|Gennady Druzhinin
|align=left|Independent
|
|29.72%
|-
|style="background-color:#3B9EDF"|
|align=left|Viktor Orlov
|align=left|Fatherland – All Russia
|
|21.43%
|-
|style="background-color:"|
|align=left|Mikhail Sannikov
|align=left|Independent
|
|19.70%
|-
|style="background-color:"|
|align=left|Sergey Uoday
|align=left|Independent
|
|7.13%
|-
|style="background-color:"|
|align=left|Viktor Gayulsky (incumbent)
|align=left|Our Home – Russia
|
|5.30%
|-
|style="background-color:"|
|align=left|Vladimir Ivanov
|align=left|Independent
|
|5.24%
|-
|style="background-color:"|
|align=left|Vladimir Uvachan
|align=left|Russian All-People's Union
|
|4.00%
|-
|style="background-color:"|
|align=left|Ismagil Dominov
|align=left|Independent
|
|0.82%
|-
|style="background-color:"|
|align=left|Viktor Gitin
|align=left|Yabloko
|
|0.40%
|-
|style="background-color:"|
|align=left|Ivan Kuznetsov
|align=left|Independent
|
|0.38%
|-
|style="background-color:"|
|align=left|Lyudmila Plutulevichene
|align=left|Independent
|
|0.30%
|-
|style="background-color:"|
|align=left|Ilya Sergeyev
|align=left|Independent
|
|0.24%
|-
|style="background-color:#000000"|
|colspan=2 |against all
|
|3.96%
|-
| colspan="5" style="background-color:#E9E9E9;"|
|- style="font-weight:bold"
| colspan="3" style="text-align:left;" | Total
| 
| 100%
|-
| colspan="5" style="background-color:#E9E9E9;"|
|- style="font-weight:bold"
| colspan="4" |Source:
|
|}

2003

|-
! colspan=2 style="background-color:#E9E9E9;text-align:left;vertical-align:top;" |Candidate
! style="background-color:#E9E9E9;text-align:left;vertical-align:top;" |Party
! style="background-color:#E9E9E9;text-align:right;" |Votes
! style="background-color:#E9E9E9;text-align:right;" |%
|-
|style="background-color:"|
|align=left|Oleg Stolyarov
|align=left|United Russia
|
|77.52%
|-
|style="background-color:"|
|align=left|Ruslan Delokarov
|align=left|Independent
|
|2.31%
|-
|style="background-color:#000000"|
|colspan=2 |against all
|
|18.85%
|-
| colspan="5" style="background-color:#E9E9E9;"|
|- style="font-weight:bold"
| colspan="3" style="text-align:left;" | Total
| 
| 100%
|-
| colspan="5" style="background-color:#E9E9E9;"|
|- style="font-weight:bold"
| colspan="4" |Source:
|
|}

References

Obsolete Russian legislative constituencies
Politics of the Evenk Autonomous Okrug